The Australian Retirement Trust (ART) is an Australian superannuation fund headquartered in Brisbane, Queensland. With $230bn under management and over 2 million members, it is Australia's second-largest superannuation fund.

History

The Australian Retirement Trust was founded on 28 February 2022 following the merger between Sunsuper and QSuper. It was the largest superannuation fund merger in Australian history.

On 30 April 2022, the Australia Post Superannuation Scheme (APSS) was merged into the Australian Retirement Trust. In May 2022, Woolworths Group appointed the Australian Retirement Trust to manage its corporate superannuation services.

On 21 February 2023, the Commonwealth Bank Group Super announced it had entered into a memorandum of understanding to pursue a merger with the Australian Retirement Trust.

See also
Superannuation in Australia
AustralianSuper
Aware Super
Vanguard Super

References

External links 
 Official website

Superannuation funds in Australia
Companies established in 2022
2022 establishments in Australia
Companies based in Brisbane